The Hudson River in New York and New Jersey is full of islands, though some have been filled in to connect to the shore. Some of the islands have the Hudson on one side and have another river or creek on the other side. Many of the defunct islands are still labeled on NYSDOT and USGS quadrangle maps.

Past and present islands in the Hudson River

This list is of past and present islands in the Hudson River and their locations;
 Adams Island, within the city of Troy, New York, Hudson River on both sides, it is east of Center Island, the Collar City Bridge carries NY Route 7 over the island's southern tip
 Bear Island, a former island in Bethlehem, New York
 Beeren Island, southern border of the Rensselaerswyck patroonship
 Breaker Island, formerly two islands called Culyer and Hillhouse, it is a former island within the town of Colonie, New York and the village of Menands, New York, filled in by the construction of exit 7 of Interstate 787 with NY Route 378, Hudson River remains on east bank and various creeks, ponds, small lakes, and marshes on the west side
 Campbell Island on the Hudson, Castleton-on-Hudson, NY, 90 plus acres now part of a peninsula, rare underwater rights, high ground, cove and beach area, near Albany NY, across from Bethelehem Park and boat/kayak launches, with an expansive dock approval, available.
 Center Island, formerly called Magills Island and Starbucks Island, it is within the village and town of Green Island, the Hudson River is on both sides, the Green Island Bridge connects it to Troy, New York
 Cow Island
 Esopus Island
 Five Hook Island
 Green Island, once had a branch of the Mohawk River's delta on west side, filled in and replaced with Interstate 787
 Iona Island, located in Stony Point, New York, is a designated National Natural Landmark as a National Estuarine Research Reserve and a Significant Coastal Fish and Wildlife Habitat Area. Additionally, is serves as a bird sanctuary for Bald Eagles.
 Lower Patroon Island, formerly an island in the city of Albany, New York, was filled in by the construction of interchange of Interstate 90 (exit not numbered) and Interstate 787 (exit 5), Hudson River remains on east bank, is a part of the Corning Preserve, lends its name to the Patroon Island Bridge, which connects it to the city of Rensselaer, New York
 Manhattan, an island and a borough of New York City
 Papscanee Island, now a peninsula, Hudson River on west bank, Papscanee Creek on east bank, in Schodack, New York and East Greenbush
 Park Island, also called Island Park – a former island that hosted the Albany County Agricultural Fair in 1865, had a racetrack in 1866, and an addition of a baseball diamond and clubhouse in 1885.
 Pollepel Island, known for Bannerman's Castle serving as a tourist attraction within the Hudson Valley.
 Schermerhorn Island, a former island in Bethlehem, New York
 Schodack Island, in Schodack, New York
 Shad Island, a former island in Coeymans, New York
 Stomy Island, within the village and town of Green Island, Hudson River on both sides, north of Center Island
 Van Rensselaer Island, a former island in Rensselaer, New York
 Van Schaick Island, within the city of Cohoes, New York, Hudson River on east side and a branch of the Mohawk River on the west, 112th Street Bridge connects it to Troy, New York
 Westerlo Island, Albany, has over the past 400 years been called Castle Island, Martin Gerritse's Island, Patroon's Island, Van Rensselaer Island, and since the late 19th century Westerlo Island. (Van Rensselaer Island is also the name of a former island opposite Albany, in the city of Rensselaer.)

References

 
Islands, Hudson
Islands, Hudson